The 2015 UCI Oceania Tour was the eleventh season of the UCI Oceania Tour. The season began on 28 January 2015 with the New Zealand Cycle Classic and finished on 28 February 2015 with The REV Classic.

The points leader, based on the cumulative results of previous races, wears the UCI Oceania Tour cycling jersey. Robert Power from Australia is the defending 2014 UCI Oceania Tour champion.

Throughout the season, points are awarded to the top finishers of stages within stage races and the final general classification standings of each of the stages races and one-day events. The quality and complexity of a race also determines how many points are awarded to the top finishers, the higher the UCI rating of a race, the more points are awarded.
The UCI ratings from highest to lowest are as follows:
 Multi-day events: 2.HC, 2.1 and 2.2
 One-day events: 1.HC, 1.1 and 1.2

Events

Final ranking

External links
 

UCI Oceania Tour
2015 in men's road cycling
U